The Tigers is a 1991 Hong Kong action thriller film directed by Eric Tsang, and starring Andy Lau, Tony Leung, Felix Wong, Michael Miu and Kent Tong, who were the Five Tiger Generals of TVB in the 1980s. It is a film adaptation of the 1984 TVB serial, Rise and Fall of a Stand-In which featured the film's stars Miu and Tong.

The Tigers tells the stories of a team of five Hong Kong detectives. While busting a drug deal the brother-in-law of one of the detectives is found to be implicated and gives them a large amount of cash in exchange for their silence. But with the money comes hassle, as the organised crime syndicate want more and more in exchange for their money, leading to an action packed tale of police corruption.

Plot
Veteran CID inspector Lam Fong-tin of the Royal Hong Kong Police Force leads his squad consisting of sergeants Lau Chi-ming, (nicknamed Thief), Dandruff, Pong and Wah to bust the firearms smuggler Sha-pei. Through interrogation, Sha-pei tips the squad about an upcoming drug trade between triad leaders Wai and Chiuchow Ping. During the operation at the ship yard to bust their deal, Wai was arrested, but Tin was shocked to discover his brother-in-law, Fong Heung-tung, working for Wai. Tung pleads Tin to let him go and leaves him a briefcase of HK$10 million cash before fleeing by jumping into the water. However, Thief and Dandruff take the money instead of reporting it as evidence and plan to share it with the rest of the squad, but Pong furiously refuses his share due to his upright morals and berates the two. Thief promises to bear full responsibility if anything goes wrong.

Tung pleads with Tin to release Wai, but Tin furiously refuses, so Tung threatens him, knowing the squad took the money. Tin and his squad persuade Pong, who arrested Wai, to give false testimonials in court to release Wai, to which Pong also reluctantly agrees. Afterwards, the squad attempts to negotiate with Tung and return his money, but Tung refuses the money and forces them to collude with him, threatening to report them to the ICAC if they refuse. Tung gives them a tip about another deal between Wai and Ping, hoping to usurp Wai's position. The squad busts the deal where they arrest Ping, but let him go free in a scheme to turn him against Wai and get them both arrested along with Tung.

Ping arrives with his underlings at a disco bar to settle the score with Wai before he reveals to the latter that Tung tipped the police (thanks to information from Tin), as Thief and Dandruff wait nearby to make arrests. Tung manages to kill both Wai and Ping and flees amidst the chaos to the parking lot where Dandruff stops him. However, Dandruff clumsily drops his pistol, which was picked up by Tung, and Thief arrives and exchanges fire with Tung, while Dandruff starts his car in order to flee the scene with Thief. Unexpectedly, Tung manages to get in Dandruff's car and shoots the latter dead before fleeing.

Tung calls CID superintendent Cho and reveals the corruption of Tin and the squad to him, but Cho instead shelters his underlings, so Tung threatens to report them to the ICAC. The squad set up a trap to arrest Tung, who counters and gets Pong arrested by the ICAC. Not long after, Tin, Thief and Wah get arrested and detained by the ICAC as well, while Pong was released without charge. Tung becomes a witness for the ICAC and is under their protection. After 48 hours, Thief and Wah are released, but Tin is officially under investigation by the ICAC. At this time, Tung is also suspected of murder by the police and must give a testimony at the police station where Pong beats him to a pulp. While the ICAC escort Tung out of the police station, Thief, armed with a blade, attempts to murder Tung, but fails and flees with the help of a colleague.

Pong bails Tin out briefly when the latter reconciled with his estranged daughter, Shirley, before being detained again. In order to protect his squad, Tin decides to bear all responsibility for the corruption and hangs himself in his jail cell. After hearing the news of Tin's death, Thief, Pong and Wah are determined to settle the score with Tung at Volvo Hotel, where Tung is staying under the protection of the ICAC. Since Tin died, ICAC investigation team captain Tam tells Tung that the case is closed and will send him to the police for the murder of Dandruff. Tung escapes by killing two ICAC officers assigned to protect him, but Thief, Pong and Wah arrive just in time to stop him, ensuing a prolonged chase and a fight at the hotel where Wah is killed after Tung throws him off multiple stories. Eventually, Thief and Pong subdue Tung just as the SDU arrive. Despite the SDU's presence, Thief shoots Tung dead before shooting himself in front the police, fulfilling the promise that he made at the beginning that he will bear all responsibility.

Cast
 Andy Lau as Lau Chi-ming (劉志明), nicknamed Thief (賊仔), a smart but impulsive and crafty CID sergeant who is one of the Five Tigers who took the money.
 Tony Leung as Dandruff (頭皮), a smart but somewhat clumsy CID sergeant who is one of the Five Tigers. He took the money in order to support his younger brother who is studying overseas in Canada.
 Felix Wong as Pong (阿邦), a righteous CID sergeant and the only one who did not take the money. He is the sole survivor among the five tigers.
 Michael Miu as Wah (華哥), also a righteous CID sergeant and breadwinner of his family. He took money in order to support his wife and son.
 Kent Tong as Fong Heung-tung, the main antagonist. He is the brother-in-law of Uncle Tin and an ambitious and nasty triad who blackmail the Tigers.
 Bryan Leung as Lam Fong-tin (林況天), respectfully referred as Uncle Tin (天叔), a veteran CID inspector and the leader of the Tigers.
 Irene Wan as Shirley, Uncle Tin's estranged daughter and Pong's girlfriend
 Shing Fui-On as Shing Sha-pei (沙皮), triad member and firearms smuggler
 Philip Chan as Cho Siu-ping (曹少平), a CID superintendent and the superior officer of the Tigers.
 Yammie Lam as Wah's wife.
 Lo Lieh as Chiuchow Ping (潮洲炳), a drug dealer and Wai's business partner.
 Chen Kuan-tai as Brother Wai (威哥), a triad leader and Tung's boss.
 Eric Tsang as a SDU member. (cameo)

Theme Song
Yu Gu Du Zai Ben Wang
Composed by: Lau Yi Tat
Lyrics by: Andy Lau
Arranged by: Lau Yi Tat
Performed by Andy Lau

Related films
 Brothers, a 2007 Hong Kong action crime thriller drama film also starring Andy Lau, Michael Miu, Eason Chan, Huang Yi, Kent Tong and Felix Wong. 
 Lust, Caution, a film starring Tony Leung.

References

External links 
 

1991 films
1991 action thriller films
1991 crime thriller films
1990s Cantonese-language films
Hong Kong action thriller films
Hong Kong crime thriller films
Police detective films
Films set in Hong Kong
Films shot in Hong Kong
Films about the illegal drug trade
Films with screenplays by James Yuen
Films directed by Eric Tsang
Triad films
1990s Hong Kong films